In Whyte notation for the classification of steam locomotives by wheel arrangement, an 0-4-4-2 is a locomotive that has no leading wheels, two sets of four driving wheels and two trailing wheels.

Equivalent classifications
Other equivalent classifications are:
UIC classification: BB1 (also known as German classification and Italian classification)
French classification: 020+021
Turkish classification: 22+23
Swiss classification: 2/2+2/3

Examples
0-4-4-2Ts were built for Indonesia until 1962, becoming some of the last Mallets built in the world.

External links
Indonesian Mallet engine information.

44,0-4-4-2